Evelyn Aldrich was an American businesswoman employed by the American International Corporation in New York City during the 1920s. She was appointed to a special committee of the American Institute of Banking by its president, R.S. Hecht. The committee also included two other women, noted in the organization's Journal only as "Mrs. Bruce Baird of Chicago" and "Mrs. E. C. Erwin of New Orleans," as well as three men. Together, they submitted a preamble and resolution aimed at addressing the needs of women in the banking industry, which were adopted by the Institute with a "near unanimous" vote. By delivering an address to the 500 delegates in attendance on September 18, 1918, Aldrich became the first female speaker to the American Institute of Banking convention.

References

American women in business
Year of birth missing
Year of death missing